Alexey Kudrya (born 1982) is a Russian operatic lyric tenor. He began his musical career playing flute.

Noting on his tenor style, Benjamin Ivry in The New York Sun commented: "Russia's Alexey Kudrya, who has won medals in several vocal competitions, has a refined lyric voice ideal for recordings and smaller opera houses." His first engagements in his native Russia took him to the Stanislavsky Theatre in Moscow, also known as Stanislavski and Nemirovich-Danchenko Moscow Academic Music Theatre.

In 2006, he also sang under the baton of Teodor Currentzis in concert performances in Moscow and Novosibirsk to mark the 250th anniversary of Mozart's birth.

CommandOpera said in 2010 that "Alexey Kudrya is the most exciting Russian Tenor on the planet today: his vocal instrument positively ‘weeps’ in the most Italianate fashion."

Performances and competitions
In October 2005, Kudrya became a laureate of the international competition Neue Stimmen (2nd prize). In 2006, he debuted in Europe singing Lensky's aria from Eugene Onegin at the International Opera Singers Competition of Galina Vishnevskaya (2nd prize).

In 2009, he won first prize in Plácido Domingo’s Operalia Competition held in Hungary, and as well as the Special Prize offered by the Hungarian State Opera. In the same competition, the first prize award for soprano was Julia Novikova, also from Russia.

In the 2010/11 season, he debuted at the Vienna State opera, singing Almaviva in Il barbiere di Siviglia in December/January.

References

External links
Profile by Peoples
Photos by Stanmus
LA Times Culture Monster''
Operalia Winners 2009
Opera Competition
Padova Cultura
Vlaamse Opera

1982 births
Living people
Operalia, The World Opera Competition prize-winners
Russian classical flautists
Russian operatic tenors
21st-century Russian male opera singers
Gnessin State Musical College alumni
21st-century flautists